"Mistrustin'  Blues" is a song written by Johnny Otis. It was sung by Little Esther and Mel Walker, accompanied by The Johnny Otis Orchestra, and released on the Savoy label (catalog no. 735-A). The record was the second collaboration between Johnny Otis and Little Esther.  "Mistrustin Blues" was their second number one record on the R&B chart, which it topped for four weeks. It was ranked No. 10 on Billboard magazine's year-end list of R&B records for 1950 based on sales (No. 15 based on juke box plays).

See also
 Billboard Top R&B Records of 1950

References

1950 songs
1950 singles
Songs written by Johnny Otis